The Justices of the Peace Act 1547 (1 Edw 6 c 7) was an Act of the Parliament of England.

The whole Act, so far as unrepealed, was repealed by section 8(2) of, and Part II of Schedule 5 to, the Justices of the Peace Act 1968.

This Act was repealed for the Republic of Ireland by sections 2(1) and 3(1) of, and Part 2 of Schedule 2 to, the Statute Law Revision Act 2007.

See also
Justices of the Peace Act

References
Halsbury's Statutes,

External links
List of repeals in the Republic of Ireland from the Irish Statute Book.

Acts of the Parliament of England (1485–1603)
1547 in law
1547 in England